The Church of England, also known as the Anglican Church, became the established church of the Province of Maryland through an Act of the General Assembly in 1692. Ten counties had been established in the colony at the time, and those counties were divided into 30 parishes. After 1692 but before the American Revolution, 15 additional parishes were established.

The following is a sortable List of the post 1692 Anglican parishes in the Province of Maryland.

See also
 List of the original 30 Anglican parishes in the Province of Maryland

References

External links
 Skirven, Percy G., The First Parishes of the Province of Maryland, Baltimore: Norman Remington Co., 1923

 
 
Church of England lists